Gaston Gibéryen (born 29 June 1950, in Born) is a Luxembourgish politician for the Alternative Democratic Reform Party (ADR) and trade unionist.  He is one of the ADR's four members of the national legislature, the Chamber of Deputies, representing the Sud constituency since he was first elected in the 1989 election.  He is the leader of the ADR deputation in the Chamber.

Gibéryen was mayor of Frisange from 1982 until 2005, having previously been an échevin in the commune (1976–1981).

Footnotes

External links
  Chamber of Deputies official biography

Mayors of places in Luxembourg
Members of the Chamber of Deputies (Luxembourg)
Members of the Chamber of Deputies (Luxembourg) from Sud
Councillors in Frisange
Alternative Democratic Reform Party politicians
Luxembourgian trade unionists
1950 births
Living people
Mompach